Mordellistena hypopygialis is a beetle in the genus Mordellistena of the family Mordellidae. It was described in 1968 by Ermisch.

References

Alphabetical index of species group names to the 5th volume of the Palearctic Coleoptera catalog

hypopygialis
Beetles described in 1968